{{Infobox film
| name           = Malice in Wonderland
| image          = Malice_in_wonderland_2009.jpg
| caption        = Malice In Wonderland DVD cover
| director       = Simon Fellows
| producer       = Carola Ash Nicole Carmen-Davis Claus Clausen Larry Collins Stephen Margolis Albert Martinez Martin Charles Salmon Glenn M. Stewart Mark Williams
| writer         = Jayson Rothwell
| starring       = Maggie Grace Danny Dyer Matt King Nathaniel Parker
| music          = 
| cinematography = 
| editing        = 
| studio         = 
| distributor    = Sony Pictures Home Entertainment
| released       = 
| runtime        = 87 minutes
| country        = United Kingdom
| language       = English
| budget         = 
| gross          = 
}}Malice in Wonderland ''' is a 2009 British fantasy adventure film directed by Simon Fellows and written by Jayson Rothwell. It is roughly based on Lewis Carroll's 1865 novel Alice's Adventures in Wonderland.

The film was released on DVD in the UK on 8 February 2010.

 Plot 
A modern take on the famous story by Lewis Carroll, it is  about a university student (Maggie Grace) who is knocked over by a black cab in Central London. When she wakes up, she has amnesia, lost in a world that is a long way from home—Wonderland. She is dragged through a surreal, frightening underworld filled with bizarre individuals and low-lifes, by the cab driver, Whitey (Danny Dyer). Confused, she tries to find out who she is, where she is from, and use what wits she has left to get back home.

 Cast and characters  
 Maggie Grace as Alice 
 Danny Dyer as Whitey
 Nathaniel Parker as Harry Hunt
 Matt King as Gonzo
 Pam Ferris as The Duchess
 Bronagh Gallagher as Hattie
 Anthony Higgins as Rex
 Paul Kaye as Caterpillar
 Gary Beadle as Felix Chester
 Lin Blakley as Mrs. Jones

Critical receptionMalice in Wonderland'' received negative reviews from critics. On Rotten Tomatoes, the film has a rating of 10%, based on 10 reviews, with an average rating of 8.6/10.

References

External links

2009 films
British crime films
Films based on Alice in Wonderland
British fantasy films
2000s English-language films
Films directed by Simon Fellows
2000s British films